Calvin Augustine Hoffman Waller (December 17, 1937 – May 9, 1996) was a United States Army lieutenant general.

Early life and education
Waller was born to an African American family in Baton Rouge, Louisiana, on December 17, 1937. He graduated from Prairie View A&M University in 1959 with a bachelor's degree and later from Shippensburg College of Pennsylvania with a master's degree in public administration in 1978.

Military career
Waller spent 32 years in the United States Army and served in the Vietnam War. Waller held a variety of staff and command positions which included: chief of staff, 24th Infantry Division (Mechanized), Fort Stewart, Georgia; Commanding General, 8th Infantry Division (Mechanized), V Corps, U.S. Army Europe and Seventh Army.

Waller was the deputy commander-in-chief for military operations with United States Central Command (Forward), during the Persian Gulf War.

Waller's last duty assignment was as Commanding General, I Corps at Fort Lewis, Washington, before he retired from the military at the rank of lieutenant general, on November 30, 1991.

Opposition to military service by homosexuals
Waller vehemently opposed, like most other military members, homosexuals serving openly in the United States Armed Forces. During the 1993 U.S. Senate hearings on allowing homosexuals to serve openly in the United States military, Waller vigorously opposed it. He declared that "to compare [his] service in American's armed forces with the integration of avowed homosexuals is personally offensive."

Later life and death
After retiring from the military, Waller moved to Denver, Colorado, and served as the president and chief executive officer of an environmental technology company, RKK Limited. He then became the senior vice president for the Department of Energy Programs for the ICF Kaiser Environmental and Energy Group. In July 1995, Waller became the Kaiser-Hill vice president for site operations and integration at Rocky Flats Environmental Technology Site.

Waller died in Washington, D.C., on May 9, 1996, at the age of 58, due to complications from a heart attack. He was buried at Arlington National Cemetery, in Arlington, Virginia.

Upon learning of his death, President Bill Clinton said, "His rise from humble beginnings to one of the highest-ranking African American officers in the U.S. military through stalwart determination and a record of excellence served as an inspiration to minority and non-minority officers." Clinton also cited Waller's reputation as a "skillful and disciplined professional and a caring, enthusiastic commander."

Awards and decorations

Waller's civic awards include the Martin Luther King Jr. "Buffalo Soldier" Award from the Congress of Racial Equality, the Roy Wilkins Renown Service Award from the NAACP and the "Star of Texas" award from the state of Texas.

References

External links

 

1937 births
1996 deaths
African-American United States Army personnel
United States Army personnel of the Vietnam War
Burials at Arlington National Cemetery
Military leaders of the Gulf War
Recipients of the Air Medal
Recipients of the Distinguished Service Medal (US Army)
United States Army generals
Prairie View A&M University alumni
People from Baton Rouge, Louisiana
Shippensburg University of Pennsylvania alumni
Recipients of the Defense Distinguished Service Medal
African Americans in the Vietnam War